1777 in sports describes the year's events in world sport.

Boxing
Events
 4 June — Harry Sellers retained his English championship against Joe Hood in a 1 hour fight at Ascot Heath.
 2 July — Harry Sellers retained his English championship against Joe Hood in a 30 minute fight at Ipswich.

Cricket
Events
 James Aylward scored 167 for Hampshire against an England XI at Sevenoaks Vine to create a new record for the highest individual innings in first-class cricket. The record stood until 1806.
England
 Most runs – James Aylward 390
 Most wickets – Thomas Brett 29

Horse racing
England
 St Leger Stakes – Bourbon

References

 
1777